KVI (570 AM) is a commercial radio station in Seattle, Washington.  Owned by Lotus Communications, it airs a conservative talk radio format called "News Talk 570 KVI." Its transmitter is on Vashon Island and its studios and offices are located with former sister station KOMO-TV at KOMO Plaza (formerly Fisher Plaza) in Seattle.

On weekdays, KVI airs both local and nationally syndicated shows.  Local hosts include John Carlson and Ari Hoffman.  National hosts include "Markley, VanCamp and Robbins" (whose show is syndicated from the WMBD studios in Peoria, IL), Dana Loesch, Rita Cosby and "Red Eye Radio."  Two versions of "The Lars Larson Show" are heard, one for the Northwest at noon and a national show at 2 a.m.  Weekends feature shows on money, health, wine, cars and home improvement, some of which are paid brokered programming. Syndicated weekend shows include "Sunday Night Live with Bill Cunningham" and "Somewhere in Time with Art Bell."  Most hours begin with ABC News Radio.

History

Early years
KVI's history can be traced back to November 24, 1926.  It signed on the air on 1280 kilocycles and was licensed to Tacoma. By the spring of 1928 its frequency shifted to 1060 AM, followed by another shift to 760 AM in the fall. By September 1932, it had moved to its permanent home at 570 AM.  It was powered at 1,000 watts and was owned by the Puget Sound Broadcasting Company.  During the "Golden Age of Radio," KVI was a network affiliate of CBS, carrying its schedule of dramas, comedies, news, sports, game shows, soap operas and big band broadcasts.  It also carried programs from the Don Lee Network.

In 1949, KVI relocated its city of license to Seattle and got a boost to 5,000 watts.  KVI broadcast from a single tower on Vashon Island and it moved its studios into the Camlin Hotel in Downtown Seattle.  With its arrival in Seattle, it shifted its network to the Mutual Broadcasting System, since KIRO was already the CBS affiliate in Seattle.

AC and MOR music
In 1959, Gene Autry's Golden West Broadcasters added KVI to its portfolio.  KVI switched to an adult contemporary format in 1964. By 1973, KVI had evolved into a full service, middle of the road (MOR) direction. It was during this period that it became established as a dominant player in the market. KVI was the flagship station for the ill-fated Seattle Pilots baseball team in their only season of play in 1969. It later became the radio home for the successful Seattle Mariners, from their inaugural season of 1977 until 1984. KVI was also the original home of the Seattle Sounders (NASL) from their inaugural season in 1974 until 1976, and was the westside flagship station of the Washington State University Cougars from 1972 until 1979 and again from 1983 until 1987.

In 1976, KVI acquired an FM radio station, KETO at 101.5 MHz. Under Golden West, the new KVI-FM became a successful Adult Top 40 station, now known as KPLZ-FM.  With the beginning of the 1980s, music listening on AM radio was shifting to FM and KVI added several talk shows.

Oldies and Talk
On July 23, 1984, KVI switched to oldies. That direction would last less than a decade, and by 1992, KVI had a fulltime talk radio format.  At first, the station used the slogan "the balanced alternative" with a line up alternating liberal and conservative talk hosts, but by 1993, KVI dropped all its liberal hosts except Mike Siegel.  Siegel, formerly a liberal, swung right in his views during this period and remained on the station.  The other slots were filled by a line up of both local and nationally syndicated conservatives.  By May 1994, the year KVI and KPLZ were sold to Fisher Communications, KVI had an almost entirely conservative-talk format.

KVI returned to a full service format at 4 p.m. on November 7, 2010, with a mix of oldies and recent hits, news and traffic updates.

Smart Talk
Due to the failure of the format, which only garnered an average of a 0.5 share of the market, KVI began stunting with Christmas music on Thanksgiving Day, 2011. On January 3, 2012, the station flipped back to talk, this time as "Smart Talk," with an emphasis on entertainment reports, lifestyle and health info, and local news. Programs included "Sunrise Seattle", a Good Morning America-type program hosted by Mark Christopher and Elisa Jaffe, Don Imus, Clark Howard, Phil Hendrie, "The Buzz" with Scott Carty, the "Daily Wrap from the Wall Street Journal" with Michael Castner, ConsumerMan with Herb Weisbaum, as well as paid brokered programming on weekends. After only nine months, the "Smart Talk" format was dropped on September 4, 2012 in favor of a return to conservative talk.

On April 11, 2013, Fisher announced that it would sell its properties, including KVI and KOMO-TV, to the Sinclair Broadcast Group.  The price for all the stations was $373.3 million. 
Although nearly all of Sinclair's broadcast properties are television stations, the company initially retained KVI, KPLZ-FM, KOMO and KOMO-FM. The deal was completed on August 8, 2013.

On June 3, 2021, Sinclair announced they would sell KVI, KPLZ and KOMO-AM-FM to Lotus Communications for $18 million. Sinclair retained KOMO-TV. The sale was completed on September 28, 2021.

References

External links
FCC History Cards for KVI

Conservative talk radio
VI
Talk radio stations in the United States
Radio stations established in 1926
News and talk radio stations in the United States
Lotus Communications stations
1926 establishments in Washington (state)